Daqiao is a town in Xinfeng County, Ganzhou, Jiangxi province, China. , it has 3 residential communities and 6 villages under its administration.

See also 
 List of township-level divisions of Jiangxi

References 

Township-level divisions of Jiangxi
Xinfeng County, Jiangxi